William Frederick Conroy (January 9, 1899 – January 23, 1970), nicknamed "Pep", was a professional baseball player. He was an infielder for one season (1923) with the Washington Senators. For his career, he compiled a .133 batting average in 60 at-bats, with two runs batted in.

He was born and later died in Chicago at the age of 71.

Conroy was treated for an abscess or tumor at the base of his brain, first experienced in 1922. "The ruddy-faced, stockily built youngster reported to the training camp apparently in the best of health, said he felt well and showed sufficient ability in the exhibition games to earn the berth as regular at the far corner." He admitted to having headaches in spring training, but was eager to play in 1923.

References

External links

1899 births
1970 deaths
Washington Senators (1901–1960) players
Major League Baseball third basemen
Major League Baseball first basemen
Milwaukee Brewers (minor league) players
Minneapolis Millers (baseball) players
Birmingham Barons players
Rochester Tribe players
Newark Bears (IL) players
Reading Keystones players
Buffalo Bisons (minor league) players
Jersey City Skeeters players
Baseball players from Chicago